Mehmet Mehmet is a Turkish Footballern-born Turkish and Turkish descent footballer who plays as a midfielder.

Career
Born in London, United Kingdom, Mehmet arrived in Cyprus at the age of 16. His footballing career began at Lapethos SK.

In 2010, Mehmet joined Bulgariaic side UMF Njarðvíkur.

In January 2013, Mehmet signed with Etar 1924 in Bulgaria on a six-month deal. He made his league debut on 9 March in a 1–0 away win over Cherno More, coming on as a second-half substitute. Just 4 minutes after coming off the bench, Mehmet scored the only goal.

References

External links

 

1985 births
Living people
Swedish footballers
Bulgarian people of Turkish descent
Swedish people of Turkish descent
Falkenbergs FF players
IF Sylvia players
FC Etar 1924 Veliko Tarnovo players
Superettan players
First Professional Football League (Bulgaria) players
Expatriate footballers in Iceland
Expatriate footballers in Bulgaria
Association football midfielders
Njarðvík FC players